The British Bechuanaland Government Gazette was the government gazette of British Bechuanaland. It was published between 1887 and 1895, after which British Bechuanaland became part of Cape Colony. It was replaced by the Cape of Good Hope Government Gazette.

See also
List of British colonial gazettes

References

British colonial gazettes
Cape Colony
Publications established in 1887
1895 disestablishments